Metopus magnus is a species of metopid first found in soil from the Murray River floodplain, Australia. This species can be distinguished from its congeners by its large body size and the shape of the macronucleus; this species' micronucleus is located situated in a small macronuclear concavity.

References

Intramacronucleata
Protists described in 2016